Mankillers, also known as 12 Wild Women, is a 1987 action film written and directed by David A. Prior.

Filmed in 1986 in and around Riverside, California, United States, it was shot back to back with Deadly Prey as part of the newly formed Action International Pictures.

The alternate title notwithstanding, Mankillers actually features fifteen women as members of the titular commando unit, not twelve.

Plot
A female CIA agent is assigned to train and lead an all-female combat squad to Colombia to stop a renegade agent who has hired himself out to a drug cartel and white slaver.  Unfortunately, the agent's recruits consists of prison convicts - murderesses, sociopaths, bank robbers, etc.  These women are guaranteed clean slates on their records if the mission is successfully pulled off.  Their past "experience" from their criminal endeavors offers them some insight and skill, but most of their mission-specific training will require them to learn team effort, self-sacrifice, and the ability to follow orders and achieve mission objectives.

Cast
Edd Byrnes as Jack Marra
Gail Fisher as Joan Hanson
Edy Williams as Sgt. Roberts
Lynda Aldon as Rachael McKenna
William Zipp as John Mickland
Christine Lunde as Maria Rosetti
Suzanne Tegmann as Terry Davis
Marilyn Stafford as Roxanne Taylor
Paul Bruno as Bruno
Bryan Clark as Williams
Thyais Walsh as Vicki Thompson
Bainbridge Scott as Christine Rollins
Cyndi Domino as Trish Daniels
Amber Star as K.C. Grimes
John Taylor as Mannetti
Sheila Best as Margaret Skinner
Naomi Delgado as Vannesa Shaw
Arlene Julian as Lisa Leonardo
Veronica Carothers as Shannon Smith

Release
Mankillers was released on DVD and Blu-ray on September 13, 2016.

References

External links

1987 action films
Action International Pictures films
1987 films
Films shot in California
American action films
Films scored by Mark Mancina
Films directed by David A. Prior
1980s English-language films
1980s American films